Stoniškiai is a village in the south western Lithuania. It is located in the region of the former Baltic tribe of Skalvians. It is the capital of Stoniškiai eldership (Stoniškių seniūnija) of Pagėgiai Municipality, and as such it is part of Tauragė County.

History
The name of the village is derived from Stonys, Stonis (Lithuanian family names). Stoniškiai was first mentioned in 1785.

In the second half of the 19th century, there was a highway and a railroad, so the village became a transport hub and grew a bit faster. In 1905, 136 people lived in Stoniškiai. In the interwar period, Sportverein Stonischken (1923: Möwe Stoniškiai) was one of the most powerful football teams of Lithuania Minor outside Klaipėda.

Stoniškiai eldership 
2279 people live in Stoniškiai eldership, lit. Stoniškių seniūnija (January 2013). The territory of the eldership covers an area of 13400 ha.

Stoniškiai school   
In 1890, a school in Rukai founded. In 1945, Stoniškiai primary school was established. In 1950, a seven-year-old school was established, followed by a secondary school. In 1959, the first class of abitur graduated from the school. From 2004, there was a  Stoniškiai comprehensive school and since 2013 Stoniškiai comprehensive school of Pagėgiai municipality (Pagėgių sav. Stoniškių pagrindinė mokykla).

Opocal field 

Stoniškiai has the best-explored opoka field in Lithuania with an area of over 25 ha. It is estimated that the field has 17.8 million tonnes of opoka.

References 

Stoniškiai. Mažoji lietuviškoji tarybinė enciklopedija, T. 3 (R–Ž). Vilnius, Vyriausioji enciklopedijų redakcija, 1971, 308 psl.
Stoniškiai. Tarybų Lietuvos enciklopedija, T. 4 (Simno-Žvorūnė). – Vilnius: Vyriausioji enciklopedijų redakcija, 1988. 111 psl.

External links 

 School of Stoniškiai

Villages in Tauragė County